Nincut (Aboro) is a Plateau language of Kaduna State, Nigeria belonging to the Beromic branch. Blench estimates 5,000 speakers in 2003. It is spoken 7 km north of Fadan Karshe in Kaduna State. Nincut is not recorded in Ethnologue or Glottolog.

References

Beromic languages
Languages of Nigeria